The  Bavarian Class A, later B IX were German steam locomotives with the Bavarian Eastern Railway (Bayerische Ostbahn).

Crampton version 
The engines had an external frame with outside drive and valve gear. They had the smallest wheel diameter (1,828 mm) of any locomotive of this type in the whole of Germany. Between 1869 and 1871 all the engines were rebuilt in Regensburg and were given a 1 B axle arrangement. They were then given locomotive numbers 1081–1092.

Stephenson version 
The second series of this class was built to a Stephenson design. They did not differ greatly in terms of boiler and driving gear from the locomotives of the first series. These engines were also converted in Regensburg between 1870 and 1871 to vehicles with a 1B axle formula. In addition the boiler overpressure was raised from 6 to 10 bar. They were then given locomotive numbers 1069–1080.

Tender 
Both series were equipped with 3 T 7 tenders.

See also 
Royal Bavarian State Railways
List of Bavarian locomotives and railbuses

4-2-0 locomotives
2-2-2 locomotives
B 09 Ostbahn
Standard gauge locomotives of Germany
Maffei locomotives
Railway locomotives introduced in 1857
Passenger locomotives